Alen Ovčina (born 27 February 1989) is a Bosnian handball player for Sloboda Tuzla and the Bosnia and Herzegovina national team.

Club career
Over the course of his career, Ovčina played for Sloboda Tuzla, Bosna Sarajevo, Gračanica, Al Shamal (Qatar), Vogošća, Antalyaspor (Turkey) and Vojvodina (Serbia).

International career
A Bosnia and Herzegovina international since 2014, Ovčina participated at the 2015 World Championship in the nation's debut appearance in major tournaments. He also took part at the 2020 European Championship.

Honours
Vojvodina
 Serbian Handball Super League: 2018–19
 Serbian Handball Cup: 2018–19
 Serbian Handball Super Cup: 2018, 2019

References

External links
 EHF record
 SEHA record

1989 births
Living people
Sportspeople from Tuzla
Bosnia and Herzegovina male handball players
RK Vojvodina players
Expatriate handball players
Bosnia and Herzegovina expatriate sportspeople in Qatar
Bosnia and Herzegovina expatriate sportspeople in Turkey
Bosnia and Herzegovina expatriate sportspeople in Serbia